Time Defeated by Love, Beauty and Hope or Allegory of Time and Beauty is a 1627 painting by Simon Vouet, now in the Museo del Prado, in Madrid, which bought it in London in 1954.

Description
The titan Cronus is personified as the inexorable Time that devours everything, only occasionally stopped or defeated by Love, Beauty and Hope. The allegory is shown in a somewhat humorous and jovial way.

Time, with the scythe of death and an hourglass, is brought down by Beauty and Hope, helped by some putti, who attack the old man on the ground, in a humorous way, biting and plucking his wings. A wreath of flowers identifies Hope, while Beauty, for whom Vouet supposedly used his wife, Virginia da Vezzo, as a model, pulls out some of his hair.

References

External links
Time Defeated by Love, Beauty and Hope, Prado Museum (Spanish)

Paintings of the Museo del Prado by French artists
Paintings by Simon Vouet
1627 paintings
17th-century allegorical paintings
Allegorical paintings by French artists